John Miller (27 February 1881 – 10 April 1957) was a Scottish road racing cyclist who competed for Scotland in the 1912 Summer Olympics. He came 35th in the individual time trial and Scotland came fourth in the team event. He was born in Pittsburgh, United States.

References

1881 births
1957 deaths
Scottish male cyclists
Olympic cyclists of Great Britain
Cyclists at the 1912 Summer Olympics
Scottish Olympic competitors
Sportspeople from Pittsburgh